Afrin Region is the westernmost of the three original regions of the Autonomous Administration of North and East Syria.

The region previously had two subordinate cantons, the Afrin Canton, consisting of the Afrin city area (with the Şêrewa, Mobata, Şêra and Maydankah districts subordinate to it), the Jindires area (with the Şiyê district subordinate to it), Rajo area (with the Bulbul, Maydana and Bahdina districts subordinate to it), as well as the Shahba Canton consisting of the Tell Rifaat area (with the Ahraz, Fafin and Kafr Naya districts subordinate to it). The status of Manbij was unclear; while some reports described it as part of the Shabha Canton and Afrin Region, communal and regional elections weren't held there, and official documents that clarified the new regional framework didn't refer to Manbij.

Afrin Region was first declared autonomous under the name of Afrin Canton in January 2014. The subdivision of the Autonomous Administration of North and East Syria was renamed to Afrin Region during subdivision-congresses held in July and August 2017, while the name 'Afrin Canton' was then given to one of its two subdivisions as the canton or province became the name for second-level subdivisions in the Federation. Most of the Region's territory (including Afrin Canton) is under the Turkish occupation of northern Syria since early 2018. The last elected prime minister of Afrin Region was Hevi Ibrahim. The administrative centre of the region was the city of Afrin (now Tell Rifaat).

Demographics

The western, mountainous part of Afrin Region area is overwhelmingly ethnic Kurdish, to the degree that this area has been described as "homogeneously Kurdish". The central and eastern parts of Afrin region have a mixed ethnicity are ethnically highly diverse population of area consists of Arab Syrians and Arabized Kurds found throughout the area, as well as a considerable Circassian and Chechen population in the city of Manbij and a considerable Syrian Turkmen and Arabized Turkmen population toward the north of this area. A smaller minority are Armenians. Toponymy and maps published by the French colonial authorities indicate that a significant percentage of inhabitants of this area who are officially classified as Arabs actually have Kurdish origins.

Manbij and Tell Rifaat are the largest cities administered by de facto autonomous civil administrations operating under the umbrella of the Autonomous Administration of North and East Syria. According to the 2004 Syrian census Manbij had 99,497 inhabitants, and Tell Rifaat had 20,514.

History

The Afrin region area has seen human settlement since the early neolithic.

According to René Dussaud, the region of Kurd-Dagh and the plain near Antioch were settled by Kurds since antiquity. Stefan Sperl says that there is a reason to believe that Kurdish settlements in the Kurd Mountains go back to the Seleucid era, since those regions stood in the path to Antioch; Kurds in the early periods served as mercenaries and mounted archers. In any case, the Kurd Mountains were already Kurdish-inhabited when the Crusades broke out at the end of the 11th century.

In Classical Antiquity, the region was part of Chalybonitis (with its center at Chalybon or Aleppo), Chalcidice (with its center at Qinnasrīn العيس), and Cyrrhestica (with its center at Cyrrhus النبي حوري). This area was one of the most fertile and populated of the region. Under the Romans the region was made in 193 CE part of the province of Coele Syria or Magna Syria, which was ruled from Antioch. The province of Euphratensis was established in the 4th century CE in the east, its center was Hierapolis Bambyce (Manbij) which is still the main city of the region.

Under the Rashidun and Umayyad Muslim dynasties, the region was part of the Jund Qinnasrīn. In the Abbasid period the region was under the independent rule of the Hamdanids. The Mamluks and later the Ottomans governed the area until 1918. During the Ottoman Empire (1299–1922), the region was part of the Vilayet of Aleppo. The largest of the Kurdish-speaking tribal groups in northern Syria was the Reshwan confederation, which was initially based in Adıyaman Province but eventually also settled throughout Anatolia. The Milli confederation, mentioned in 1518 onward, was the most powerful group and dominated the entire northern Syrian steppe in the second half of the 18th century. The Kurdish dynasty of Janbulad ruled the region of Aleppo as Ottoman governors in 1591–1607. At the beginning of the 17th century, districts of Jarabulus and Seruj on the left bank of the Euphrates had been settled by Kurds.

During the French Mandate the region was part of the brief State of Aleppo. In modern post-independence Syria, the Kurdish society of the region was subject to heavy-handed Arabization policies by the Damascus government.

In the course of the Syrian Civil War, Damascus government forces pulled back from the region in spring 2012 to give way to autonomous self-administration within the Rojava framework, which was formally declared on 29 January 2014, and the territory of Afrin Region virtually never saw civil war combat. It was however at various times the target of artillery shelling by Islamist rebel groups as well as by Turkey. In response, Russian military troops reportedly stationed themselves in Afrin as part of an agreement to protect the YPG from further Turkish attacks.

In early 2018 Afrin and surrounding areas were occupied by Turkish backed forces. Since, the forces supported by Turkey have been accused of human rights violations by the human rights commissioner to the United Nations, Michelle Bachelet.

Politics and administration

According to the Constitution of Rojava, Afrin Region's Legislative Assembly on its 29 January 2014 session declared autonomy. The assembly elected Hêvî Îbrahîm Mustefa prime minister, who appointed Remzi Şêxmus and Ebdil Hemid Mistefa her deputies.

The remaining Executive Council was appointed as follows:

Economy

Afrin is well known for its olive groves. The areas governed by the SDC are under a blockade imposed by neighbouring Turkey, which places high burdens on international import and export. For example, transportation of Aleppo soap to international markets, as far as possible at all, has at least four times the transportation cost as compared to pre-war years. In 2015 there were 32 tons of Aleppo soap produced and exported to other parts of Syria, but also to international markets.

Education

Like in the other Rojava regions, primary education in the public schools is initially by mother tongue instruction either Kurdish or Arabic, with the aim of bilingualism in Kurdish and Arabic in secondary schooling. Curricula are a topic of continuous debate between the regions' Boards of Education and the Syrian central government in Damascus, which partly pays the teachers.

The federal, regional and local administrations in Rojava put much emphasis on promoting libraries and educational centers, to facilitate learning and social and artistic activities.

Afrin Region has institution of higher education. Most notably previously the University of Afrin, founded in 2015. After teaching three programs (Electromechanical Engineering, Kurdish Literature and Economy) in the first academic year, the second academic year with an increased 22 professors and 250 students has three additional programs (Human Medicine, Journalism and Agricultural Engineering).

See also
Federalization of Syria
Rojava conflict
Autonomous Administration of North and East Syria
Jazira Region
Euphrates Region

References

Works cited

External links
 Map of majority ethnicities in Syria by Gulf2000 project of Columbia University

States and territories established in 2014
2014 establishments in Syria
Aleppo Governorate